The Yamaha RX-5 is a programmable digital sample-based drum machine built by Yamaha, in 1986.

Features

The RX-5 has 24 built-in digitally sampled drum sounds and another 28 on the RX5 ROM cartridge that was included with every RX5. The sounds include bass drum, snare drum, rimshot, toms, hi hat, cymbal (ride or crash), hand clap, tambourine, cowbell, and shaker. The included cartridge contains mainly Latin percussion instruments. The RX5 has 12 individual outputs for each vertical drum pad pair. Each pair has a fixed set of sounds at its disposal, for example 6 base drum samples at the first two buttons. There is a workaround to have other sounds in each location. When you customise a sound to one of the 10 copied sounds presets, they become available on all pads.

The RX-5 also features "Attack" and "Decay" envelope controls, a pitch envelope, and effects such as reverse, damp, pitch bend, and accent.

Sequencer
The sequencer section can record up to 100 patterns with time signatures ranging from 01/32 to 99/2 in either Real Time or Step Time record modes with lengths of 1-99 bars. Real Time recorded patterns can be quantized to the nearest 1/2 to 1/48 note. Patterns can be arranged in up to 20 songs.

Storage
The RX5 has a RAM/ROM cartridge slot for storing custom edited sounds and loading in new sounds as well. The RX5 was shipped by Yamaha with one additional cartridge of sounds—the "RX5 ROM". Three additional Waveform ROM Cartridges were made to suit various genres: WRC-02 "Jazz/Fusion," WRC-03 "Heavy Metal," and WRC-04 "Effects." There were also a few third-party cartridges made, containing TR-808 and TR-909 samples, but they are rather rare. Various projects to create compatible USB connected cartridges are in progress.
Additionally, a custom ROM cart utilizing flash memory and a Teensy microcontroller, the RX5USB is available and allows the loading of custom sounds to the RX-5.

References

Further reading
 Yamaha RX-5 User's Manual

External links
 Vintage Synth Explorer: Yamaha RX-5
 Yamaha RX-5 resource | free samples, manual and schematics
 Yamaha Black Boxes | Yamaha RX5 Digital rhythm programmer

Drum machines
Musical instruments invented in the 1980s